Pumpkinhead: Ashes to Ashes is a 2006 made-for-television supernatural slasher horror film and the third installment in the Pumpkinhead film series of horror films. The film is directed by Jake West (Evil Aliens), who co-wrote the screenplay with Barbara Werner.

Plot 
Pumpkinhead: Ashes to Ashes plotline follows more closely to the first film, with townspeople angered over the local mortician stealing and selling the organs of their loved ones and then dumping the corpses in a swamp, rather than cremating them. When the townspeople find out, they have the old witch Haggis summon Pumpkinhead through the mummified body of Ed Harley (played by Lance Henriksen, who reprises his role from the first film). Pumpkinhead then proceeds to go on his killing rampage murdering all those responsible for the desecration, while Doc Frasier (Doug Bradley) hurries to murder those who summoned Pumpkinhead, which will effectively kill the demon in the process.

Cast
 Doug Bradley as Dr. "Doc" Fraser
 Lance Henriksen as Ed Harley
 Lisa McAllister as Dahlia Wallace
 Tess Panzer as Molly Sue Allen
 Emanuel Parvu as Oliver Allen
 Ioana Ginghina as Ellie Johnson
 Douglas Roberts as Bunt Wallace
 Radu Iacobian as Richie
 Catalin Paraschiv as Ronnie Johnson
 Dan Astileanu as Sheriff Bullock
 Dicu Aurel as Tiny Wallace
 Iulian Glita as Junior Wallace
 Lynne Verrall as Haggis
 Emil Hostina as Lenny
 Philip Bowen as Reverend McGee
 Vasilescu Valentin as Deputy Ben
 Bart Sidles as Fred
 Mircea Stoian as Agent Bensen
 Radu Banzaru as Agent Black

Production 
Initially announced as Pumpkinhead 3, it was filmed back-to-back with another sequel titled Pumpkinhead 4 in Bucharest, Romania. The films were renamed Pumpkinhead: Ashes to Ashes and Pumpkinhead: Blood Feud, respectively, before their release.

Release 
Pumpkinhead: Ashes to Ashes premiered on SCI FI on October 28, 2006.

Reception 

Ian Jane of DVD Talk rated it 2/5 stars and criticized its "cheap, shoddy filmmaking". Dread Central rated it 2/5 stars and wrote: "Despite the cast and crew’s obvious devotion to the original, Ashes to Ashes hits every pitfall in the low-budget realm". Virginia Heffernan of The New York Times called it unmemorable and "rote slasher stuff". In an interview with youtuber Comic Book Girl 19, Lance Henriksen expressed his disappointment with the film.

References

External links 
 

2006 television films
Syfy original films
2006 horror films
English-language Romanian films
2000s monster movies
Dark fantasy films
Demons in film
American supernatural horror films
British supernatural horror films
Pumpkinhead (film series)
Television sequel films
American horror television films
Films directed by Jake West
Films shot in Romania
American monster movies
Romanian supernatural horror films
2006 films
Films about witchcraft
Films about organ trafficking
Films produced by Donald Kushner
2000s English-language films
Swiss horror films
2000s American films
2000s British films
Sony Pictures direct-to-video films